Angkalanthus oligophylla is a species of plant in the family Acanthaceae. It is endemic to Yemen.  Its natural habitats are subtropical or tropical dry forests and rocky areas.

References

Acanthaceae
Endemic flora of Socotra
Endangered plants
Taxonomy articles created by Polbot
Taxa named by Isaac Bayley Balfour